Melville Calman (19 May 1931 – 10 February 1994) was a British cartoonist best known for his "little man" cartoons published in British newspapers including the Daily Express (1957–63), The Sunday Telegraph (1964–65), The Observer (1965-6), The Sunday Times (1969–84) and The Times (1979–94).

Early life
Born in Stamford Hill, North London, Mel Calman was the youngest of the three children of Clement Calman, a timber merchant, and his wife, Anna (both Russian-Jewish immigrants who came to England about 1912).

Evacuated to Cambridge to avoid the Blitz in World War II, he was educated at the Perse School. Failing to gain entrance to read English at University of Cambridge, he returned to London where he enrolled at the Borough Polytechnic Art School.

After two years of national service, he studied illustration at Saint Martin's School of Art.

Career
In 1956, he attempted to find work as a freelance cartoonist. Punch was discouraging about his work, but in 1958 he succeeded in placing work with the "William Hickey" column in the Daily Express. Although in regular work, he left the Express after five years, seeing no prospects being in competition with Osbert Lancaster and Carl Giles.

In 1962 he began producing his trademark "little man" character for the Sunday Telegraph, and in 1979 he brought this as a regular and long-running contribution to The Times. Additionally, he made contributions to Cosmopolitan and House & Garden, as well as publishing some 20 books of his cartoons.

Calman's trademark character was the angst-ridden "little man", who strongly reflected Calman's own lifelong depressions (in Who's Who he listed his recreations as "brooding and worrying"). Topics focused on the little man's anxieties about health, death, God, achievement, morality and women, a style of humour that his Times obituary described as "of the black, self-deprecating Jewish variety, in the style of his New York heroes, James Thurber, S. J. Perelman and Woody Allen".

A small-format single-frame "pocket cartoon", the little man series used hand-lettered text in soft pencil and minimalist detail, a technique he had evolved due to early weaknesses in draughtsmanship.

Personal life and death
He was married twice, to the magazine designer Pat McNeill and to the artist Karen Elizabeth Usborne. He had two daughters with Pat McNeill — the novelist Claire Calman and author and screenwriter Stephanie Calman. In later life he became an art dealer and collector, in 1989 co-founding the Cartoon Art Trust.

On 10 February 1994, he died of a coronary thrombosis (heart attack) at the Empire Cinema, Leicester Square while watching the film Carlito's Way with writer Deborah Moggach, his partner for the last ten years of his life. He is buried alongside his mother and sister at the Jewish cemetery, Waltham Abbey, Essex.

Recognition
Calman is commemorated by a historical plaque on his former residence at 64 Linthorpe Road, Hackney, where he lived from 1931 until 1957.

References

Citations

Sources 
Simon Heneage, "Calman, Melville  (1931–1994)", Oxford Dictionary of National Biography, Oxford University Press, 2004 accessed 19 July 2007

External links
Mel Calman, British Cartoon Archive, University of Kent
Billy Ireland Cartoon Library & Museum Art Database

1931 births
1994 deaths
Alumni of Saint Martin's School of Art
British cartoonists
British Jews
British people of Russian-Jewish descent
People from Stamford Hill
People educated at The Perse School
Alumni of London South Bank University
Alumni of Goldsmiths, University of London